Rehbinder is a German surname, and Baltic nobility of Westphalian origin:
 Berndt-Otto Rehbinder (1918–1974), Swedish Olympic fencer
 Johan Adam Rehbinder (1733–1809), Swedish historian
 Rehbinder (noble family)
 Henrik von Rehbinder (1604–1680), Friherre of the Udriku Manor in Swedish Estonia
 Robert Henrik Rehbinder (1777–1841), Secretary of State for the Grand Duchy of Finland
 Piotr Rehbinder, Russian physicist, chemist
 Rehbinder effect

Low German surnames